Tord Linnerud (born 10 August 1974) is a rallycross driver from Gjøvik, Norway. He has a large amount of experience in motorsport, competing in the Swedish Touring Car Championship at the turn of the millennium and more recently the World and European rallycross championships.

Racing record

Complete Swedish Touring Car Championship results

Complete FIA European Rallycross Championship results

Supercar

Complete FIA World Rallycross Championship results

Supercar

References

External links

Tord Linnerud on Facebook
Official profile page at the World RX website

1974 births
Living people
Sportspeople from Gjøvik
Norwegian racing drivers
European Rallycross Championship drivers
World Rallycross Championship drivers